Tayatzin was a king of Tepanec city of Azcapotzalco in Mexico. He is also called Quetzalayatzin.

Biography
He was born as a prince, the son of king Tezozomoc and queen Chalchiuhcozcatzin, who was Tezozomoc's main wife.

His half-siblings were kings Quaquapitzahuac and Maxtla and queen Xiuhcanahualtzin. He was an uncle of Tlacateotl and Emperor Chimalpopoca of Tenochtitlan.

After his father's death, Tayatzin became a king of his city. Maxtla was a king of Coyoacán, but he seized power at Azcapotzalco, leaving the rulership of Coyoacán to his son Tecollotzin.

Chimalpopoca allied with Tayatzin, and the two conspired to retake the throne. Friendly relations between Tenochtitlan and Azcapotzalco were thus replaced by insults and violent intrigue.

Tayatzin was killed, and Chimalpopoca decided to offer himself as a sacrifice at the altar of his father Huitzilíhuitl.

Notes

Tlatoque of Azcapotzalco
15th-century monarchs in North America
15th-century indigenous people of the Americas